Guiday Mendy (born May 18, 1986 in Pontoise, France) is a French basketball player who plays for club Cavigal Nice of the League feminine de basket the top league of basketball for women in France.

References

French women's basketball players
1986 births
Living people
Sportspeople from Pontoise